The Boondock Saints II: All Saints Day is a 2009 American film written and directed by Troy Duffy. The film serves as a sequel to the 1999 film The Boondock Saints. The film stars Sean Patrick Flanery and Norman Reedus, who return to their roles, as well as several of the other actors from the first film.

The film takes place eight years after the events of the original Boondock Saints, as fraternal twin brother vigilantes Connor (Flanery) and Murphy (Reedus) are living a quiet life in Ireland with their father, the former assassin known as "Il Duce". However, they are drawn back into action after someone attempts to frame the twin brothers for the murder of a priest in Boston. Connor and Murphy travel back to the United States, where they meet some old friends and are pursued by Eunice Bloom (Julie Benz), an FBI agent and former protégée of Agent Smecker.

Plot

After the MacManus twins, Connor and Murphy, and their father, Noah (Il Duce), assassinated Joe Yakavetta, they fled to Ireland. Eight years later, their uncle Father Sibeal arrives to inform them that a renowned Boston priest was murdered by a mysterious assassin who attempted to frame the Saints by using their ritual assassination style. In response, the twins dig up their old gear and weapons and depart for the United States.

En route to Boston aboard a container ship, the twins meet a Mexican underground fighter named Romeo, who recognizes them as the Saints. Romeo convinces them to let him join them as their new partner. Hearing a radio broadcast regarding Joe's son, Concezio Yakavetta, they deduce that he must have hired the hitman who killed the priest to draw them out of hiding.

Meanwhile, Detectives Greenly, Dolly, and Duffy are at the scene of the priest's murder. They are greeted by Special Agent Eunice Bloom, the protégée of Paul Smecker (who has died) who has been assigned to investigate the murder and determine whether or not the Saints are responsible. She comes to the conclusion that the Saints were not who murdered the cleric, and begins an investigation to find the real assassin. She and the other officers find out the assassin is Ottilio Panza, a man who appears to be working for a mysterious man known only as "The Old Man".

Connor, Murphy, and Romeo hit a warehouse that is being used by a Chinese Triad gang to process heroin for Yakavetta. After killing everyone at the warehouse, Connor and Murphy reunite with their old bartender friend, Doc. They learn that the assassin was an independent contractor and that Yakavetta himself is hiding in the Prudential Tower. Later at the warehouse, now a crime scene, Bloom confirms that the Saints have returned. Bloom interrupts a massage in progress and hits a mob boss with a paddle, displaying her identity.

The twins and Romeo have one of Yakavetta's caporegimes named Gorgeous George set up a meeting with a group of mobsters at a bar, where they kill them. Panza arrives shortly after and attempts to ambush the twins, but Bloom arrives in time to save them by wounding Panza, who then flees. Bloom introduces herself, revealing her intentions to help the Saints in Smecker's place. The group then cleans up the crime scene to make it look as if the mobsters had turned on each other. Later, Bloom reunites the other detectives with the Saints, thus bringing them in on their plans.

Yakavetta calls a meeting with his crew, during which the Saints arrive and kill everyone, including Yakavetta. Bloom interrogates Yakavetta's consigliere Jimmy and learns of the Old Man's involvement with Panza. The crime scene is visited by FBI Special Agent Kuntsler, who takes over the gang murder case after suspending Bloom. Later at the bar, Greenly arrives to celebrate the boys' victory, but is shot and killed by Panza. Noah, earlier having decided to help his sons, unexpectedly arrives to demand Panza tell him the Old Man's location. They engage in a type of "Russian roulette" stand-off, and after Panza still refuses to answer, Noah angrily shoots him dead.

Noah reveals to the group that in 1958 New York, he watched a trio of mobsters brutally murder his father. Consumed with rage and revenge, Noah hunted down and killed the mobsters with the help of his best friend Louie, who is revealed to be the Old Man. Noah still felt unsatisfied, so Louie helped him pick out mobsters to kill. They continued this until 1975, when Louie gave Noah up to the police.

Bloom illegally obtains a file regarding Louie's location and gives it to Noah. Louie, anticipating the Saints' arrival at his mansion, has several hit men stationed on the grounds. When the MacManus family arrives, Louie reveals that he had only used Noah to eliminate the competition in the Mafia, afterwards giving him up to the police when he was no longer useful. After this, however, the Mafia cast Louie himself out for the same reason. He then helped rebuild the Yakavetta family after Joe's demise and let the Saints take out the rest of the organization so Louie could take control. Louie signals the hit men waiting to take out the Saints to make their move, but the Saints kill them all. Noah suffers a fatal gunshot wound, but kills Louie before he dies. The police arrive and arrest the wounded Connor, Murphy, and Romeo.

Bloom meets with Father Sibeal, who has arranged to take her to a safe place out of the country to flee FBI prosecution. She is shocked to discover that Sibeal has been working with Smecker, who faked his own death and developed a network of support for the Saints and their work. Smecker tells Bloom his plans to break the Saints out of prison.

As protesters outside of the prison shout for the freedom of the Saints, Connor and Murphy stare out of their window at the sea of prisoners in the yard, finding that they will have plenty of work while they wait to be freed.

Cast

 Sean Patrick Flanery as Connor MacManus, one-half of the MacManus twins. In addition to the "Veritas" tattoo on his left hand, he now has a tattoo of Christ's upper torso and face on his back.
 Norman Reedus as Murphy MacManus, the other half of the MacManus twins. In addition to the "Aequitas" tattoo on his right hand, he now has a tattoo of Christ's nailed feet on his back.
 Clifton Collins Jr. as Romeo, a Mexican fighter who becomes the twins' new sidekick.
 Billy Connolly as Noah 'Il Duce' MacManus, the father of the MacManus twins.
Matthew Lemche as Young Noah MacManus
 Julie Benz as FBI Special Agent Eunice Bloom, the agent assigned to the gang murders connected to the Saints. She is a former apprentice of Paul Smecker.
 Willem Dafoe as FBI Special Agent Paul Smecker, an ally of the MacManus twins in the first film. He fakes his own death and reveals at the end that he has started an agency funded by the Catholic Church that will help the Saints escape from jail and continue their work as vigilantes.
 Judd Nelson as Concezio 'Little Yaka' Yakavetta, the son of Don 'Papa' Joe Yakavetta, who was executed by the Saints in court eight years ago. He hires a hitman to execute a priest to call out the Saints.
 Bob Marley as Detective David Greenly, a detective partnered with 'Dolly' and Duffy. 
 David Ferry as Detective 'Dolly' Alapopskalius, a detective partnered with Duffy and Greenly.
 Brian Mahoney as Detective Duffy, a detective partnered with 'Dolly' and Greenly.
 Peter Fonda as Louie 'The Roman' Romano, Noah's former friend, who had him sent to prison in 1975.
Robert Mauriell as Young Louie Romano
 Daniel DeSanto as Ottilio 'The Little Man' Panza, a hitman of short stature hired by Yakavetta to kill a priest.
 David Della Rocco as David 'The Funny Man' Della Rocco, the twins' former sidekick, who was killed by Joe Yakavetta in the first film. He appears in flashbacks and dream sequences.
 Paul Johansson as FBI Special Agent Bill Kuntsler, the agent who suspends Special Agent Bloom and takes over the gang murder case.
 Gerard Parkes as 'Doc' McGinty, the owner of an Irish pub and a friend of the twins. He has a stutter and Tourette syndrome.
 Bob Rubin as George 'Gorgeous George', Yakavetta's underboss from Brooklyn. He is forced by Special Agent Bloom and the twins to give information on the Yakavetta clan.
 Mairtin O'Carrigan as Father Sibeal MacManus, he is the cousin of Noah MacManus.
 Louis Di Bianco as Patronazzi, an old mobster and friend of Louie's.
 Aaron Berg as Joe 'Jo-Jo' Rhama, one Yakavetta's top lieutenants.
 Richard Fitzpatrick as The Chief, Chief of the Boston Police Department.
 Tig Fong as Asian Gangster, leader of the Chinese Triads who is smuggling drugs for Yakavetta.
 Pedro Salvin as Uncle Cesar, Romeo's uncle and an alley of the Saints.
 Sweeney MacArthur as Jacob MacManus, Noah's father who was killed by mobsters in the 1950s.
 Dwayne McLean as Father Douglas McKinney, a priest who was killed in attempt to frame the Saints.
 Robb Wells as Jimmy 'The Gofer' Green, Concezio Yakavetta's consigliere

Production
After years in development hell, the success of the first film's DVD release spurred 20th Century Fox to finance a sequel. In March 2008, Troy Duffy confirmed the film was greenlit.
Pre-production on the film started in early September 2008. Principal photography took place in Ontario from October 20, 2008 to December 10, 2008.

Duffy kept a video diary of the film's progress on YouTube, with some of the shooting sequences, and "question and answer" segments from fans answered by the film's stars.

Marketing and release
The film's first trailer was officially released online on September 2, 2009, via IGN. The film was initially released in 67 theaters in the Northeastern and Western areas of the continental US, and was gradually released into more theaters in the following weeks.

Critical reception
On Rotten Tomatoes, the film received a 23% approval rating based on 43 reviews, with a weighted average of 4.12/10. The site's consensus reads: "This sequel to the cult favorite The Boondock Saints is more of the same -- unoriginal, absurd, violent, over-the-top, and occasionally mean-spirited". Metacritic, which uses a weighted average, assigned a score of 24 out of 100 based on 16 critics, indicating "generally unfavorable reviews".

Home media
On March 9, 2010 the film was released on single disc DVD and 2-Disc Steelbook Special Edition DVD, as well as Blu-ray with special features including deleted scenes, audio commentary, and a behind the scenes featurette. As of June 2012, the film had a limited release and it has grossed $50 million in DVD sales.

On July 16, 2013, the film was released in a new Director's Cut as a Best Buy Exclusive release.

Soundtrack
The soundtrack became available for preorder in late March on the official Boondock Saints Store website and became available for purchase and digital download at other retailers April 7, 2010.

Books
A six-issue comic book series, made up of 3 2-issue chapters written by Troy Duffy and published by 12 Gauge Comics, was released in May 2010 as a companion to the film. The story is a more in-depth version of Il Duce's backstory together with the story of a hit the twin brothers performed that does not appear in the film.

There was also a mini-book available from the official Boondock Saints website which told a story that took place prior to the strip club scene from the first film. Both will eventually be released in a single graphic novel.

Sequel
Director Troy Duffy spoke about a potential sequel in an interview on June 13, 2011. He said that "We’ve been approached to do a possible Boondock Saints TV series. So the fans may be getting a part 3 as a television show. We might be able to pull that off….I actually called both Sean and Norman and they both said “hell yeah, we’ll drop everything.” On March 21, 2012 it was indicated by Sean Patrick Flanery and Norman Reedus that Boondock Saints 3 is being written, tentatively titled "The Boondock Saints III: Saints Preserve Us." However, on September 14, Norman Reedus stated that there would be no third film.

Again, on February 26, 2013, Troy Duffy stated that he was getting together with Norman Reedus and Sean Patrick Flanery to resume talks about Boondock Saints 3, in hopes that they could make the film a reality for fans. Later in 2013 at the Calgary Comic & Entertainment Expo, Sean Patrick Flanery confirmed that The Boondock Saints 3 is being worked on by Troy Duffy by saying "After the recent tragedies hit Boston I texted (director) Troy Duffy to ask him about when he would work on the third one and he replied ‘on it’". On July 16, 2013, Troy Duffy stated in an interview with CraveOnline that he was halfway finished with the script for The Boondock Saints III.

On May 6, 2017, Sean Patrick Flannery announced on Twitter that he and Norman Reedus had walked away from production of Boondock Saints III with no further explanation, leading the future of the series in doubt.

In November 2021, a third Boondock Saints film was officially announced, with Reedus and Flanery reprising their roles as Connor and Murphy MacManus and Duffy returning to direct. Production is slated to begin in May 2022.

References

External links
 
 
 
 The Boondock Saints II: All Saints Day comic book at the 12 Gauge Comics site

2009 films
American crime drama films
American sequel films
Films about father–son relationships
Films about Irish-American culture
Films about the American Mafia
Films about twin brothers
Films produced by Don Carmody
Films scored by Jeff Danna
Films set in 1958
Films set in 2007
Films set in Boston
Films set in Ireland
Films set in New York City
Films shot in Toronto
Stage 6 Films films
2000s English-language films
2000s American films